Renée of Bourbon, Duchess of Lorraine (1494 – 26 May 1539), also called, Renée, Lady of Mercœur, was a Duchess consort of Lorraine. She was a daughter of Gilbert de Bourbon, Count of Montpensier by Clara Gonzaga, and sister of Charles de Bourbon, Duke of Bourbon.

Life
Renée was brought up with her cousins, the princesses of France. On 26 June 1515 she married Antoine, Duke of Lorraine in Amboise. The marriage was arranged by the French King, Francis. Francis had promised Antoine marriage to the French queen dowager, Mary Tudor of England, but when Mary chose another spouse, Francis replaced her with Renée. 

Her entry to Nancy was described in a chronicle. She arrived at Nancy from Bar-le-Duc at the start of May 1516. First she stopped short of the town at a village called Laixou. After enjoying a magnificent picnic for six hours, she came to the gates of Nancy and was met by a choir on a scaffold singing in her honour, accompanied by cannon fire from the ramparts. 

Duchess Renée, reportedly, did not have the force of character to exert any political influence in Lorraine. However, she became known for her cultivated Italian taste, and was said to have brought "the graces and refinement of the Mantuan Court" to Lorraine. The blossoming of the arts which took place in Nancy from the reign of Antoine has been attributed to her.  
 
In August 1538, Renée was commanded to court at Compiègne to meet Mary of Austria, Queen of Hungary. In March 1539 she travelled to Neufchâteau to meet Antoine who had stomach trouble and they returned to Nancy. Renée died at Nancy of dysentery on 26 May 1539.

Issue
 Francis I, Duke of Lorraine (1517–1545), first the Marquis de Pont-à-Mousson.
 Anna (1522–1568), married firstly René of Châlon, Prince of Orange and secondly Philip II, Duke of Aerschot (1496–1549), visited by Hans Holbein the Younger as a potential bride of Henry VIII of England
 Nicolas, Duke of Mercœur (1524–1577), first Bishop of Verdun and Metz, then in 1548, Count of Vaudemont.
 Jean (1526–1532)
 Antoine (b. 1528), d. young
 Elisabeth (b. 1530), d. young

References

|-

House of Bourbon-Montpensier
Duchesses of Lorraine
1494 births
1539 deaths
15th-century French women
15th-century French people
16th-century French women